Lithuania at UCI Track Cycling World Championships have been competing regularly since 1990 and won its first medals in 1992.

List of medalists

Medals by event

2015 

Lithuania competed at the 2015 UCI Track Cycling World Championships in Saint-Quentin-en-Yvelines at the Vélodrome de Saint-Quentin-en-Yvelines from 18 to 22 February 2015. A team of 4 cyclists (4 women, 0 men) was announced to represent the country in the event.

Women

Sources

2016 

Lithuania competed at the 2016 UCI Track Cycling World Championships at the Lee Valley VeloPark in London, United Kingdom from 2–4 March 2016. A team of 4 cyclists (4 women, 0 men) was announced to represent the country in the event.

Women

Sources

References

Nations at the UCI Track Cycling World Championships
Lithuania at cycling events